New Union Old Glory is an album by Ann Beretta, released in 2001 via Lookout! Records.

Critical reception
Exclaim! wrote that "the dozen tracks are simple, down and dirty punkers that recall another time when punk rock was about a work ethic and not scoring a coveted spot on a summer tour." The East Bay Express called it "boisterous, anthemic classic punk with hoarse vocals, buzzing power chords, surfin' drums, and feel-good rabble-rousing revolution."

Track listing
"Straight Shooter (Election Day)"
"Latchkey World"
"Nowhere Generation"
"Better Days"
"Russ' Song"
"New Union"
"Glory Bound"
"Locked, Ready & Loaded"
"No Rest For The Wicked"
"Upstarts & Runaways II"
"New Day"
"Jump Start (Revolution)"

References

Ann Beretta albums
2001 albums
Lookout! Records albums